This is a list of football managers that have managed 1,000 or more games, when club and country statistics are combined.

Alex Ferguson, who took charge of a total of 2,155 competitive games between 1974 and 2013, holds the world record for the most games as a manager, starting with East Stirlingshire in Scotland and finishing with an enormously successful 27-year spell as manager of Manchester United, also including an interim spell as manager of the Scotland national football team during the mid 1980s. His long-time rival at Arsenal, Arsène Wenger, is second on the list with 1,701 games, most of which were during his 22-year spell with the Gunners. Dario Gradi, of dual English and Italian heritage, took charge of 1,557 Football League matches in a 33-year career which took in spells with Wimbledon, Crystal Palace and three spells - totalling 1,359 games - in 28 years at Crewe Alexandra.

Other managers on the list include former England managers Bobby Robson and Graham Taylor, former Manchester United manager Matt Busby, former Liverpool manager Bill Shankly, and former Derby County and Nottingham Forest manager Brian Clough.

Ignacio Trelles, Roy Hodgson and Dick Advocaat are the only managers of 1,000 or more club games and 100 or more national team games.

List
 As of 30 October 2022

Football National Team Managers with 100 or more games

See also 

 List of longest managerial reigns in association football
 List of current Premier League and English Football League managers
 List of Premier League managers

References

Lists of association football managers